In the Dynamite Jet Saloon is rock band The Dogs D'Amour's second studio album, released in 1988. The album is the first featuring what is considered the "classic" line-up of the band.

Three of the tracks from this album ("The Kid from Kensington", "I Don't Want You to Go" and "How Comes It Never Rains") were released as singles, with promotional videos to go along with them. "How Comes It Never Rains" was the highest charting, as it reached #44 on the UK Singles Chart, all three reached the top 100.

Track listing
All songs written by Tyla, except where noted.
 "Debauchery" (Almeida, James, Ross, Tyla) - 3:57 
 "I Don't Want You to Go" - 3:49
 "How Come It Never Rains" - 4:44	
 "Last Bandit" - 3:39	
 "Medicine Man" (James, Tyla) - 4:25	
 "Gonna Get It Right" - 3:38 	
 "Everything I Want" - 3:58
 "Heartbreak" (Almeida, James, Ross, Tyla) - 3:16 
 "Billy Two Rivers" - 3:16
 "Wait Until I'm Dead" - 4:09	
 "Sometimes" - 4:18 *	
 "The Kid from Kensington" - 3:40 *	
 "The State I'm In" - 4:21 *

Tracks 11-13 were bonus tracks on the CD version of the album. Vinyl and cassette copies consisted only of tracks 1-10.

Band
Tyla - vocals
Jo "Dog" Almeida - guitars
Steve James - bass
Bam - drums

Singles
 "The Kid from Kensington" (1988) UK #88
 "I Don't Want You to Go" (1988) UK #78
 "How Comes It Never Rains" (1989) UK #44

1988 albums
The Dogs D'Amour albums